Apodroma is a genus of moths in the family Geometridae described by Warren in 1901.

Species
Apodroma subcoerulea Warren, 1901
Apodroma quadrisectaria (Mabille, 1885)

References

Larentiinae
Geometridae genera